Walk the Way the Wind Blows is the third studio album by American country music singer Kathy Mattea. It was released in 1986 (see 1986 in country music) on Mercury Records. This album produced Mattea's first Top Ten country hit in "Love at the Five and Dime", which reached #3 on the Billboard country charts. Following this song were three more Top Ten hits: the title track at #10, "You're the Power" at #5, and "Train of Memories" at #6.

"Love at the Five and Dime", which features backing vocals from Don Williams, was also recorded by Nanci Griffith on her 1986 album The Last of the True Believers. "Song for the Life" has been covered by several artists, and was originally recorded by Rodney Crowell on his 1977 debut Ain't Livin' Long Like This. This song would later be released in 1995 as a single by Alan Jackson.

Track listing

Personnel

 Kathy Mattea – lead vocals, background vocals
 Charlie Anderson – harmonica
 Craig Bickhardt – background vocals
 Bruce Bouton – pedal steel guitar, slide guitar
 Tommy Cozart – drums
 Quitman Dennis – trombone
 Bill Donohue – piano
 Bessyl Duhon – accordion
 Ray Flacke – electric guitar
 Béla Fleck – banjo
 Pat Flynn – acoustic guitar
 Vince Gill – background vocals
 Jim Horn – saxophone
 Wayne Jackson – trumpet
 Chris Leuzinger – electric guitar
 Kenny Malone – percussion
 Tim O'Brien – electric guitar, mandolin
 Mark O'Connor – fiddle
 Jim Photoglo – background vocals
 Brent Rowan – electric guitar
 Milton Sledge – drums
 Buddy Spicher – fiddle
 K. Susan Taylor – acoustic guitar
 Wendy Waldman – background vocals
 Don Williams – background vocals
 Bobby Wood – keyboards
 Bob Wray – bass guitar 

Production notes
 Allen Reynolds – producer
 Mike Leech – arranger
 Mark Miller – engineer

Chart performance

Release history

References

1986 albums
Kathy Mattea albums
Mercury Nashville albums
Albums produced by Allen Reynolds